Bitry is a commune in the Nièvre department of central France.

Population

See also
Communes of the Nièvre department

References

Communes of Nièvre